Marijana is a feminine given name found in South Slavic languages. It is cognate to Maryanne or Mary Ann.

It may refer to:

 Marijana Goranović (born 1989), Montenegrin Paralympic shot putter
 Marijana Jevtić, Bosnian football player
 Marijana Kovačević (born 1978), Croatian tennis player
 Marijana Krajnović (born 1988), Serbian politician
 Marijana Lubej (born 1945), Slovenian sprinter
 Marijana Marković (born 1982), German fencer of Serbian descent
 Marijana Matthäus (born 1971), Serbian entrepreneur
 Marijana Mićić (born 1983), Serbian TV host
 Marijana Mišković Hasanbegović (born 1982), Croatian judoka
 Marijana Petir (born 1975), Croatian politician
 Marijana Radovanović (born 1972), Serbian singer
 Marijana Rajčić (born 1989), Australian rules football player
 Marijana Ribičić (born 1979), Croatian volleyball player
 Marijana Rupčić (born c. 1986), Croatian model
 Marijana Savić, Serbian activist
 Marijana Šurković (born 1984), Croatian swimmer

See also
 
 Marija
 Mariana (name)
 Marjana

Slovene feminine given names
Croatian feminine given names
Bosnian feminine given names
Montenegrin feminine given names
Serbian feminine given names